The Saint John Sea Dogs are a major junior ice hockey team in the Quebec Major Junior Hockey League. The team was founded as an expansion team in 2005 and play at TD Station in Saint John, New Brunswick, Canada. The Sea Dogs became the first team from Atlantic Canada to win a Memorial Cup championship, with a 2011 Memorial Cup victory. In June 2022, the Sea Dogs won the 2022 Memorial Cup. The team has also won three President's Cup championships in 2011, 2012 and 2017.

History
The city of Saint John was granted a Quebec Major Junior Hockey League expansion team for the 2005–06 season alongside the St. John's Fog Devils. The team replaced the American Hockey League's Saint John Flames that had relocated in 2003. The Sea Dogs' first head coach was Christian La Rue under general manager Bob "Tipper" LeBlanc, and the captaincy was split between Charles Bergeron and Vincent Lambert. The Sea Dogs were also given the first overall pick at the 2005 QMJHL Draft, selecting defenceman Alex Grant. The Sea Dogs did not qualify for the playoffs in the first season of play.

During the offseason, Christian La Rue was fired and replaced with former London Knights assistant coach Jacques Beaulieu. Beaulieu served as the head coach for the entire second season. Bob Leblanc resigned mid-season, and Beaulieu stepped into the dual role of coach/general manager. The Sea Dogs' poor performance in their first season granted them another first overall pick at the 2006 QMJHL Draft, where they selected another defenceman, Yann Sauvé. The team missed the playoffs again and received another first overall pick in the 2007 draft where they selected defenceman Simon Després. In the same draft round, they selected Steven Anthony 10th overall. The team also selected goaltender Robert Mayer 3rd overall at the 2007 CHL Import Draft.

The Sea Dogs did not make a first round selection in the 2008 QMJHL Entry Draft. In the second round, the Sea Dogs used their first pick to select defenceman Kevin Gagné, as well as signing Jacques Beaulieu's son Nathan to the roster. On November 19, 2008, the Sea Dogs hosted the second game of the Canada Russia Challenge, with a sell-out crowd at TD Station. The Russians defeated Team QMJHL by a score of 4–3. The 2008 Canada Russia Challenge in Saint John included four Sea Dogs players. They were Chris DiDomenico, Alex Grant, Yann Sauvé, and Simon Després. DiDomenico was not able to play for Team QMJHL due to an injury and was replaced by 17-year-old Steven Anthony. Due to high expectations before the 2008–09 season and the team under performing, the Sea Dogs traded stars such as Alex Grant and Chris DiDomenico during the Christmas trade deadline, and fired Jacques Beaulieu after a first-round playoff sweep at the hands of the Cape Breton Screaming Eagles.

In the 2009 QMJHL Draft, they chose defensemen Pierre Durepos 10th overall and forward Jonathan Huberdeau 18th overall, in the same draft round. In the 2009 CHL Import Draft, the Sea Dogs chose Russian forward Stanislav Galiev first overall and Slovak forward Tomas Jurco fourth overall. In the 2009–10 season, the Saint John Sea Dogs, playing in a strong Atlantic Division, were successful in winning 22 consecutive games. During their streak, which extended from October 17 until December 12, Saint John scored 107 goals while allowing 44. The offense was led mainly by Mike Hoffman (45 points and 8 game-winning goals), Nicholas Petersen (49), Michael Kirkpatrick (44) and rookie Stanislav Galiev (40 points). The strong defensive brigade saw its veteran, Yann Sauvé, register a +24 differential in addition to scoring 16 points. Veteran goaltender Marc-Antoine Gélinas won 15 games, allowing 1.83 goals per game along with a .933 save percentage. Following their streak, the Sea Dogs came in first place in the league standings, nine points ahead of Drummondville.

In the 2010 QMJHL Draft, they chose Saint Johner, Ryan Tesink 18th overall in the first round. On February 15, 2011, Yann Sauvé became the first player from the Saint John Sea Dogs organization to play an NHL game with his NHL draft team, the Vancouver Canucks.

The Sea Dogs tied a QMJHL record for most wins in a season with 58 in 2010–11. The Sea Dogs won their first QMJHL President's Cup on May 15, 2011. The Sea Dogs became the first team from Atlantic Canada to win a Memorial Cup on May 29, 2011.

Championships

2010 Atlantic division, regular season champions
2011 Maritime division, regular season, President's Cup, Memorial Cup champions
2012 Maritime division, regular season, President's Cup champions
2016 Maritime division champions
2017 Maritime division, regular season, President's Cup champions
2022 Memorial Cup champions

Season-by-season results

Regular season 
QMJHL season standings.

Legend: OTL=Overtime loss, SOL=Shootout loss

Playoffs

Memorial Cup
The Memorial Cup is contested annually by the champions of the Ontario Hockey League, Quebec Major Junior Hockey League, and Western Hockey League, as well as the host team.  The competition consists of a round-robin, a semi-final game, and a final game.  Below are the results of every game the Saint John Sea Dogs have competed in.

Team captains
 2005–06 Vincent Lambert / Kevin Coughlin
 2006–07 Charles Bergeron / David MacDonald
 2007–08 Alex Grant
 2008–09 Alex Grant / David Stich
 2009–11 Mike Thomas
 2011–12 Jonathan Huberdeau
 2012–13 Jonathan Huberdeau / Pierre Durepos
 2013–14 Sébastien Auger
 2014–15 Olivier LeBlanc / Mark Tremaine
 2015–17 Spencer Smallman
 2017–18 Joe Veleno / Bailey Webster
 2018–19 Anthony Boucher / Michael Campoli
 2019–20 Nicolas Guay
 2020–21 Vacant
 2021–22 Vincent Sévigny
 2022–23 Charlie DesRoches

Sea Dogs Hall of Fame
 Jonathan Huberdeau (2009–2013)
 Mike Thomas (2006–2011)

NHL alumni

Nathan Beaulieu
Thomas Chabot
Charlie Coyle
Simon Després
Christopher DiDomenico
Stanislav Galiev
Brett Gallant
Julien Gauthier
Éric Gélinas
Alex Grant
Matthew Highmore
Mike Hoffman
Jonathan Huberdeau
Bokondji Imama
Mathieu Joseph
Tomas Jurco
Yann Sauvé
Joe Veleno
Jakub Zboril

See also
List of ice hockey teams in New Brunswick

References

External links
 

Quebec Major Junior Hockey League teams
Ice hockey teams in New Brunswick
Ice hockey in Saint John, New Brunswick
Ice hockey clubs established in 2005
2005 establishments in New Brunswick